Makri may refer to:

 Makri (island), a Greek island
 Makri, Evros, a village in Greece
 Fethiye, formerly known as Makri, a city in Turkey
 Makri, Bulandshahr, a village in Uttar Pradesh, India
 a surname:
 Nancy Makri (born 1962), physicist
 Kyveli Makri, artist

See also 
 Macri, a surname	
 Nea Makri, a town in Greece